Patrick Dupriez (born 17 February, 1968) is a Belgian French-speaking former politician, who led the Ecolo party alongside co-chair Zakia Khattabi from 22 March 2015 until 19 October 2018.

Biography
Patrick Dupriez was born in the Cameroonian capital of Yaounde, before spending the first six years of his life growing up in Côte d'Ivoire, where his father worked as a construction worker. Dupriez later on began attending school in Walloon-Brabant. He studied agriculture at the Université catholique de Louvain and completed his thesis in Chile.

Dupriez participated as a representative of the Belgian Greens at the "Earth Summit" in Rio de Janeiro in 1992, which marked his entry into the Ecolo party, whose ranks he joined in 1985 at the age of 17. He moved to Ciney in 1995.

Career 
After his studies, he entered professional life by joining Diobass, an NGO whose objective is to promote the know-how of African farmers' organizations. He then directed the Environmental Education Service of the Province of Namur (the Forest Classes of Chevetogne and the Heritage Classes of Namur) for seven years. In addition to his work of networking educational experiences in the field of environmental education, he implemented the first public market in terms of sustainable food in Wallonia.

In 2002, he was elected to the municipal council of Ciney and was a Schepen from 2006 to 2009. From 2009 to 2014, he was a member of the Walloon Parliament for Ecolo, which he chaired as parliamentary president from 2012 to 2014, succeeding his party colleague Emily Hoyos,  who left her position to co-lead Ecolo. He was not re-elected to parliament in the 2014 election. In March 2015, he was elected to the dual leadership of Ecolo together with Zakia Khattabi with 60 percent of the vote at the Ecolo party conference in Charleroi. Dupriez decided to resign from his position on 19 October, 2018, citing "personal reasons".

References

1968 births
21st-century Belgian politicians
Ecolo politicians
Living people
Members of the Parliament of the French Community
Members of the Parliament of Wallonia
People from Ciney
People from Yaoundé
Université catholique de Louvain alumni